Mateusz Nowak (born 15 July 1992) is a Polish former professional cyclist.

Major results

2010
 1st  Time trial, National Junior Road Championships
2011
 7th Memoriał Andrzeja Trochanowskiego
2012
 2nd Overall Dookoła Mazowsza
1st  Young rider classification
2014
 9th Visegrad 4 Bicycle Race – GP Polski
2015
 1st  Omnium, National Under-23 Track Championships
 1st Memoriał Andrzeja Trochanowskiego
 4th Memoriał Romana Siemińskiego
 4th Puchar Ministra Obrony Narodowej
 5th Overall Dookoła Mazowsza

References

1992 births
Living people
Polish male cyclists
Place of birth missing (living people)
21st-century Polish people